William Norwood Cheesman (1 February 1847 – 7 November 1925) was an English businessman from Selby who contributed to studies on fungi and slime moulds as an amateur and founding member of the Yorkshire Naturalists' Union and the British Mycological Society. He contributed principally as a collector with most species described by others including George Edward Massee. Coprinus cheesmanii is named after him.

Cheesman was born in Winterton, Lincolnshire, and grew up at Hull. He joined the drapery business along with an uncle at Selby in 1870 but in 1878 he became interested in fungi. He began to collect specimens across the regions where he travelled including to South Africa as part of the British Association which he joined in 1900. He was elected to the Linnean Society in 1903.

Cheeseman was appointed a Justice of Peace in the last year of his life. He is buried at Brayton Cemetery.

References

External links 
 S2A3 Biographical Database of Southern African Science
 Mushrooms

1847 births
1925 deaths
British mycologists
British Mycological Society
Members of the Yorkshire Naturalists' Union